Punggol Temporary Bus Interchange is a temporary bus interchange in Punggol New Town, Singapore, located adjacent to the Punggol MRT/LRT station. It was built to allow for easy dismantling when the site is redeveloped as part of a major commercial development when Punggol New Town is more developed. The bus interchange was officially opened on 30 November 2003.

History
Before the opening of the Punggol Bus Interchange, there is only one bus terminal at Punggol, which is the Punggol Road End Bus Terminal, which has been existed since the 1980s and is home to Bus Services 82 and 83. Bus Service 83 was shortened to Hougang Central Bus Interchange, and renumbered service 147 in June 1992, and Bus Service 147 was amended via Stamford Road, Selegie Road and Little India area skipping Victoria Street and Lavender Street. Bus Service 82 was converted to a loop service from Serangoon to Punggol Road End with the opening of the North East line, as the actual route duplicated most of Bus Services 100 and 107, before it was amended to terminate at the interchange and loop at Serangoon Central, while it no longer serves Punggol Point. With the amendment, a new Bus Service 84 was introduced to cover the lost sectors of Bus Service 82 which originally served Punggol Point.

Opening

The SGD $1.9-million temporary Punggol Bus Interchange took 10 months to construct and was officially opened on 30 November 2003 by Teo Chee Hean. Before the opening of the interchange, Punggol's only bus terminal was the Punggol Road End Bus Terminal which had only two Bus Services, 82 and 83. The bus terminal was closed and converted into a bus stop when the interchange started operations.

Expansion
New boarding berths and an expanded concourse will be added once the construction is complete. Expansion works started in the third quarter of 2015 and were completed on 1 October 2017.

Services
With the opening of the interchange, Bus Service 83, plying between Sengkang and Punggol, was amended to terminate here, instead of the pair of bus-stops below Punggol. Bus Service 3 was extended from its original looping point at Pasir Ris Street 71 to provide direct links between Punggol and the new towns of Pasir Ris and Tampines, while Bus Service 62 and Bus Service 136 were extended from the former Hougang South Bus Interchange and Upper Serangoon Road to this interchange respectively.

As time went by, new services, Bus Services 34, 43, and 85 were introduced to link Punggol to Singapore Changi Airport, Upper East Coast Bus Terminal and Yishun Bus Interchange respectively.

Bus Service Enhancement Programme
In 2015, LTA introduced the Bus Service Enhancement Programme (BSEP) to improve commuting time and planned to roll out 1,000 buses to add more bus services to improve connectivity. Punggol Bus Interchange had its first service upgrade on 21 October 2012, under the Bus Service Enhancement Programme (BSEP), Bus Service 119 was extended to terminate at Punggol Bus Interchange instead of terminating at Sengkang Bus Interchange, calling at an additional four pairs of bus stops. This was followed by the introduction of Bus Service 50 on 16 December that year between Punggol and Bishan Bus Interchange. Two more bus services, Bus Service 117, which piles between Punggol and Sembawang Bus Interchange, and Bus Service 118, which plies between Punggol and Changi Business Park Bus Terminal, were introduced on 20 December 2015.

New Feeder Services
On 17 August 2014, under the Bus Service Enhancement Programme (BSEP), the bus interchange introduced its first Feeder Bus Service 386. The service plies along Punggol North, looping at Edgefield Plains. Bus Services 382G/382W, which plies along Punggol West, looping at Sumang Link, was introduced on 3 January 2016. On 12 March 2017, Bus Service 381 was rolled out to directly connect Punggol East with Waterway Point, Punggol Plaza and schools in the area.

Bus Contracting Model

Under the new bus contracting model,  all the bus routes were split into 3 route packages: Bus Service 50 under Bishan-Toa Payoh, Bus Service 117 under Sengkang-Hougang and the rest under Loyang Bus Package.

On 15 April 2015, the Loyang Bus Package was put up for tender by the Land Transport Authority. On 23 November that year, the tender was awarded to Go-Ahead Singapore Pte Ltd and as a result, Go-Ahead Singapore Pte Ltd took over the operation and management of this interchange and all bus services serving it, excluding Bus Services 50 and 117.

In order to ensure a smooth transition with minimal inconvenience to commuters, the 25 bus services in the contract were transferred in two tranches. The first tranche involved the transfer of Punggol Bus Interchange and the Bus Services 3/3A, 34/34A, 43/43M, 62/62A, 82, 83, 84, 85, 118, 119, 136, 382G/382W and 386 to Go-Ahead Singapore Pte Ltd, while the second tranche involved the transfer of Pasir Ris Bus Interchange, Changi Village Bus Terminal and the remaining: Bus Services 2, 6, 12, 15/15A, 17/17A, 36/36A/36B, 354, 358, 359, 403 and 518/518A.

Go-Ahead Singapore Pte Ltd took over Punggol Bus Interchange from 4 September 2016 onwards, with the first bus, on Bus Service 82, leaving the interchange at 5.15am. This marked the debut of the company in Singapore.

References

External links
 Interchanges and Terminals (SBS Transit)

Punggol
Bus stations in Singapore
Buildings and structures in Punggol
Transport in North-East Region, Singapore